Nawton railway station was a minor station serving the village of Nawton, North Yorkshire, England on the former Gilling and Pickering (G&P) line.

History
It opened on 1 January 1874, and closed in 1964.  Although the regular passenger service (and the track east from Kirbymoorside to Pickering) ceased in 1953, the station remained open for regular freight services and occasional special passenger trains until 1964.

Following closure, the former buildings served as the local fish and chip shop (in the weigh-bridge office), the blacksmiths shop, and more recently, the post office. Now known as Station House, it is a private residence.

References

External links
 Nawton station on navigable 1947 O. S. map

Disused railway stations in North Yorkshire
Railway stations in Great Britain opened in 1874
Railway stations in Great Britain closed in 1964
Former North Eastern Railway (UK) stations